Another Love Song may refer to:

Another Love Song (album), a 1991 album by The Frames
"Another Love Song" (Insane Clown Posse song), 1999
"Another Love Song" (Ne-Yo song), 2017
"Another Love Song", a song by Leona Lewis from I Am
"Another Love Song", a song by Mike Posner from 31 Minutes to Takeoff
"Another Love Song", a song by Queens of the Stone Age from Songs for the Deaf
"Another Love Song", a song by Uncle Kracker from Happy Hour

See also
Another Love (disambiguation)